The FIS Alpine World Ski Championships 1966 were held in South America from 4–14 August at Portillo, Chile.

To this day, it remains the only alpine world championships contested in the southern hemisphere. It took place well out of the established season, nearly five months before the first World Cup season, which began in early January 1967.

Assignment came at the FIS-Congress at Athens in May 1963, but West Germany, Switzerland, and Austria voted against.

The French team won seven of the eight individual titles, seven silver medals, and sixteen of the 24 medals.

Men's competitions

Downhill
Sunday, 7 August

Giant Slalom
Tuesday, 9 August (run 1)Wednesday, 10 August (run 2)
Killy led after the first run, with Périllat next, 0.21 seconds back.

Slalom
Sunday, 14 August 
Périllat led after the first run, with Senoner next, 0.58 seconds back.

Combined
At the World Championships from 1954 through 1980, the combined was a "paper race" using the results of the three events (DH, GS, SL).

Women's competitions

Downhill
Monday, 8 August
<div style="float:left;text-align:left;padding-right:15px">

Erika Schinegger of Austria originally won the gold medal in 1:32.63 (−0.79 sec),
 but failed a gender test prior to the 1968 Winter Olympics. Over 22 years later, Schinegger handed the gold medal to Marielle Goitschel in 1988.

Giant Slalom
Thursday, 11 August

Slalom
Friday, 5 August
First run leader Greene nearly fell in the second run and finished seventh.

Combined
At the World Championships from 1954 through 1980, the combined was a "paper race" using the results of the three events (DH, GS, SL).

Medals table

References

External links
FIS-Ski.com - results - 1966 World Championships - Portillo, Chile
FIS-Ski.com - official results for the FIS Alpine World Ski Championships

1966 in alpine skiing
1966
1966 in Chilean sport
Alp
Alpine skiing competitions in Chile
August 1966 sports events in South America